The men's 4×200 metre freestyle relay took place on 17 August at the Olympic Aquatic Centre of the Athens Olympic Sports Complex in Athens, Greece.

Team USA had a satisfactory triumph over the Australians with a gold medal for the first time since the 1996 Summer Olympics in Atlanta, Georgia. Klete Keller, along with Michael Phelps, Ryan Lochte, and Peter Vanderkaay of the Team USA, edged out the Australians, led by Ian Thorpe, to a first-place finish by 0.13 of a second, in an American record time of 7:07.33. As the defending Olympic champions from Sydney, the Australian team of Thorpe, Michael Klim, Nicholas Sprenger, and Grant Hackett earned a silver medal in 7:07.46. The Italians got the bronze in 7:11.83, after a powerful second leg from former Olympic silver medalist Massimiliano Rosolino.

Records
Prior to this competition, the existing world and Olympic records were as follows.

Results

Heats

Final

References

External links
Official Olympic Report

M
4 × 200 metre freestyle relay
Men's events at the 2004 Summer Olympics